The 1927–28 season was the second and last season of the Prairie Hockey League (PHL). Two of the league's three remaining teams played 26 games while the third team played 28.

Regular season
Two teams, the Edmonton Eskimos and Calgary Tigers, folded after the previous season leaving only three teams for this, the last PHL season. The Saskatoon Sheiks, who had finished second overall the previous season, finished first overall for this one.

Final standings
Note: W = Wins, L = Losses, T = Ties, GF= Goals For, GA = Goals Against, Pts = Points

Scoring leaders

League Championship
In the second and last championship of the Prairie Hockey League, the Saskatoon Sheiks won the PHL Championship. The Moose Jaw Maroons were the runner-up.

See also
Ice hockey at the 1928 Winter Olympics
List of NHL seasons
1927 in sports
1928 in sports

Western Canada Hockey League seasons
WCHL